The 2022 Slovak regional elections were held on 29 October 2022. For the first time, local elections took place simultaneously.

Summary results 
Alliance candidates received the most votes of any party in the country, more than half a million.The following tables summarize the elected deputies by their party affiliation (also with coalitions).

Results by region 
The following tables summarize the elected governors by their party orientation (in notes are also their parties).

References 

Regional
Slovakia
Regional elections in Slovakia